Carpostalagma is a genus of moths in the subfamily Arctiinae. The genus was described by Ferdinand Karsch in 1894.

Species
 Carpostalagma chalybeata Talbot, 1929
 Carpostalagma pulverulentus Talbot, 1929
 Carpostalagma signata Talbot, 1932
 Carpostalagma viridis Plötz, 1880

References

External links

Arctiini